2,3,5-Trimethylpyrazine (chemical formula C7H10N2)is one of the most broadly used edible synthesis fragrances.  It comes from baked food, fried barley, potatoes, and peanuts. 2,3,5-Trimethylpyrazine is used for the flavor in cocoa, coffee, chocolate, potato, cereal, and fried nuts.

Physical properties 
The specific gravity depends on the quality and the producer and the SG ranges from: 0.967-0.987

Synthesis 
2,3,5-Trimethylpyrazine can be synthesized from 2,3-butanedione and 1,2-diaminopropane. First, 1,2-diaminopropane is synthesized by amination of isopropanolamine in the presence of ammonia and a hydrogenation catalyst: Raney Ni. The effect of the amount of Raney Ni catalyst, the molar ratio of materials, reactions are as follows: the molar ratio of isopropanolamine to ammomia is 1:3.5,the reaction temperature is 160 °C, the reaction is 5 hours, the molar ratio of hydrogen to isopropanolamine is 1:5. Then the reaction consists of synthesis of 2,3,5-trimethyl-5,6-dihydropyrazine and 2,3,5-trimethylpyrazine. The optimum conditions of 2,3,5-trimethyl-5,6-dihydropropyrazine synthesis are established:2,3-butanedione which is mixed with anhydrous ethyl alcohol (the mass ratio of anhydrous ethyl alcohol to 2,3-butanedione was 5:1) is dropped to the mixture of anhydrous ethyl alcohol and 1,2-diaminopropane (the mass ratio of anhydrous ethyl alcohol to 1,2-diaminopropane was 6:1) at the even pace for four hours, the molar ratio of 2,3-butanedione to 1,2-diaminopropane is 1:1.1, the condensation reaction temperature is -5 °C.(2)The best dehydrogen oxidation conditions are as follows: air is used as oxidant, the molar ration of potassium hydroxide and 2,3,5-Trimethyl-5,6-dihydro-pyrazine is 3:1, the mass ratio of ethanol to 2,3,5-trimethyl-5,6-dihydro-pyrazine 10:1,reaction temperature 68 °C, reaction time seven hours.

There are several other ways to synthesis 2,3,5-trimethylpyrazine.
(1)Piperazine Gas phase catalytic dehydrogenation
 

(2)N-(β alkane alcohol)ethanediamine gas phase catalysis 
 

(3)Ethanediamine and methyl aldehyde gas phase catalysis
 

(4)Diamine and diol gas phase catalysis

NMR Spectrum

IR Spectrum

Use limit in food 
FEMA (mg/kg)
Soft drinks 5.0～10
Candy 5.0～10
Baked food5.0～10
Cereal 2.0
Seasoning2.0
Meat2.0
Dairy 1.0
Soup 2.0

References

Additional references
 
 2,3,5-三甲基吡嗪 | 14667-55-1
 2me3me5me-pyrazine - Synthesis
 14667-55-1, 2,3,5-trimethylpyrazine, CAS No 14667-55-1 2,3,5-trimethylpyrazine
 2,3,5-三甲基吡嗪,14667-55-1，生产厂家，价格-lookchem
 2，3，5-三甲基吡嗪的合成研究
 2,3,5-trimethyl pyrazine, 14667-55-1
 AIST:Spectral Database for Organic Compounds,SDBS

Pyrazines